Columbus Grove Local School District serves students education in the village of Columbus Grove, Putnam County, Ohio, United States. The current superintendent of Columbus Grove Schools is Nick Verhoff.

Schools
 Columbus Grove Elementary School
 Columbus Grove High School
 Columbus Grove St. Anthony's Elementary School

Superintendent and School Board
Superintendent's Office
 Nick Verhoff, Superintendent
 Mark Ellerbrock, Treasurer
 Brad Calvalege, Elementary Principal 
 Brian Best, High School/Middle School Principal

Board of Education
 Brad Brubaker, President 
 Ned A. Stechschulte, Board Member
 Brian Jones, Vice President 
 Derek Oswald, Board Member
 Derek Vance, Board Member

External links
 Columbus Grove Local School District Official Website

School districts in Ohio
Education in Putnam County, Ohio